Apterichtus ansp, the Academy eel, is a species of snake eel native to the western Atlantic Ocean from North Carolina, United States through the Bahamas to Brazil. This species can reach a length of  TL.

The specific name ansp is the acronym of the Academy of Natural Sciences of Philadelphia, where J. E. Böhlke, who named the species, was the curator.

See also 
Other species named after acronyms:
 AEECL's sportive lemur
 Klossiella quimrensis
 Turbonilla musorstom

References

Apterichtus
Fish described in 1968